Carine may refer to:

Places 
 Carine, Western Australia, a suburb of Perth
 Electoral district of Carine, in the Western Australian parliament
 Carine, Nikšić, Montenegro
 Carine (Mysia), a town of ancient Mysia, now in Turkey

Owl species 
 Little owl (Carine noctua or Athene noctua)
 Rodrigues scops owl (Carine murivora or Mascarenotus murivorus)

Other uses 
 CARINE, a theorem prover
 Carine (given name)

See also
 Carina (disambiguation)